Neomariopteris is a genus of plants dating from the Permian and Triassic Lower. Vascularized seedless plants (ferns) and reproduction by spores. They leaf type fronds. They lived in locals humid and swampy.

Location
In Brazil, the fossil  of species indefinite of the genus Neomariopteris, was located on outcrop Morro Papaléo in the city of Mariana Pimentel. They are in the geopark Paleorrota in Rio Bonito Formation and date from Sakmarian at Permian.

References

Prehistoric plant genera